Mappes is a surname. Notable people with the surname include:

George Mappes (1865–1934), American baseball player
Johanna Mappes (born 1965), Finnish evolutionary ecologist